Telephone numbers in Madagascar are seven digits long, the first two digits being an area code.

Recent ITU documents suggest the area code is preceded by a two digit operator code, for example "20" for Telecom Malagasy.

International numbering plan
International numbering format: +261 AB Z PQMCDU

where:
+261 international prefix
AB operator code (two digits for each operator)
Z area code (described as administrative area)
PQMCDU subscriber number

Country code 261
Country code 261 for all existing telecommunication networks in Madagascar.
AB – operator code
Each operator is identified by two digits described by the characters AB:
20-29 identification code for fixed service operators,
30-39 identification code for mobile service operators
Z – area code valid for Telecom Malagasy (fixed-service operator)
Madagascar is divided into six zones:
Z = 2 Antananarivo zone
Z = 4 Antananarivo zone (rest of the province)
Z = 5 Toamasina zone
Z = 6 Mahajanga zone
Z = 7 Fianarantsoa zone
Z = 8 Antsiranana zone
Z = 9 Toliara zone

National numbering plan
At national level, a closed numbering system of seven digits is used. That is, all subscriber numbers requested to the same operator Telecom Malagasy (local and national) can be obtained by dialling seven digits (ZPQMCDU).

List of National Destination codes in Madagascar

List of area codes in Madagascar

References

Madagascar
Communications in Madagascar
Telephone numbers